William T. Dwyer High School is a public high school for grades 9–12 in Palm Beach Gardens, Florida, United States. The school was named for William T. Dwyer, former vice president of Pratt & Whitney's Government Products Division and a community leader in Palm Beach County. It is best known for its Academy of Finance Program, which is part of the National Academy Foundation. It is also an International Baccalaureate school. Since its founding in 1991, William T. Dwyer High School competes for state championships in several of their varsity sports including football, basketball, baseball, cross country, track, and lacrosse.

William T. Dwyer High School has had some of the most dominant sports programs in the country. The football and basketball programs have won numerous state championships, is consistently ranked with the top programs in the country, and have produced several notable athletes who have gone into professional careers. The 2009 football program was quoted by the Palm Beach Post as being "the greatest concentration of talent in Palm Beach County history," finishing top 5 in the country across all divisions. That particular class has sent five players and counting to the NFL, and over 20 players to play collegiate football.

Notable alumni 
 Daniel Berger – PGA Tour golfer attended Florida State University and finished 2nd in the 2013 NCAA Division 1 Men's Golf Championships
 Jacoby Brissett – NFL quarterback with the Cleveland Browns, Super Bowl champion with the New England Patriots, played college football at the University of Florida and NC State, 3rd round draft pick
 Rashad Butler – offensive lineman NFL free agent, played college football at the University of Miami
 Ricardo Chambers – track and field runner at Florida State University who represented Jamaica in the 400 meter race at the 2008 Summer Olympics in Beijing
 Gerald Christian – tight end for Arizona Cardinals, Mr. Irrelevant in the 2015 NFL Draft
 Matt Elam – safety for the Saskatchewan Roughriders, played collegiately at the University of Florida, 1st round draft pick
 Alonzo Gee – small forward/shooting guard for the Denver Nuggets
 Leemire Goldwire – shooting guard for the Charlotte 49ers 
 Hunter Jones – baseball player
 Tommylee Lewis – NFL wide receiver for New Orleans Saints
 Tim Lynch – baseball player
 Scott Maine – pitcher for the Arizona Diamondbacks, played collegiately for the University of Miami
 Nick O'Leary – tight end for the Buffalo Bills, grandson of Jack Nicklaus, 6th round draft pick
 Thomas Szapucki – baseball player
 Ode Osborne - Featherweight UFC Fighter  

 Shawun Lurry - First Team All American Cornerback for the NIU Huskies

Sports Achievements

Basketball State Championships: 2004 (Class 5A), 2005 (Class 5A), 2011 (Class 5A) (Class 6A),2023

Bowling State Championships: 1995 (Boys), 2019 (Boys)

Flag Football State Championship: 2005

Football State Championships: 2009 (Class 5A), 2013 (Class 7A)

Lacrosse State Championship: 2009 (Boys)

References

External links 
 Dwyer High School Page at School District of Palm Beach County website

High schools in Palm Beach County, Florida
Public high schools in Florida
Educational institutions established in 1991
1991 establishments in Florida